Goyang is a fermented, lightly acidic vegetable food of the Himalayan Sherpa people of Sikkim state and Darjeeling hills of India, and Nepal.  It is prepared during the summer monsoon season when the leaves of the wild plant Cardamine macrophylla Willd., with the local name magane-saag, belonging to the family Brassicaceae are available abundantly for the picking in the surrounding hillside.

Preparation
The magane-saag leaves are collected, washed, cut, drained, and pressed into bamboo baskets lined with local fig leaves.  The baskets are covered with more fig leaves and stored at room temperature for nearly a month, allowing the magane-saag leaves to ferment.  The goyang is now ready and transferred to airtight containers where it is stored for two or three months.  If the fermented goyang is shaped into tightly-pressed balls and dried in the sun for several days, its shelf life may be extended.

Culinary practice
Goyang is most commonly prepared in Sherpa homes, there being no reports of its sale in the markets.  It is generally boiled with yak meat or beef, along with noodles, to make a thukpa of heavy consistency, a regularly eaten Sherpa food.

Notes

Bibliography

Darjeeling
Indian cuisine
Nepalese cuisine
Fermented foods